Moonnam Mura is a 1988 Indian Malayalam-language action thriller film directed by K. Madhu and written by S. N. Swamy. Starring Mohanlal, Suresh Gopi, Lalu Alex, Revathi, and Mukesh. The plot deals with a terrorist group kidnapping a group of political individuals who were vacationing, and the followed up rescue operation of the police led by Ali Imran.

The film was one of the highest-grossing film of the 1988, and had a record opening day collection. It also did good business in the neighboring states Tamil Nadu and Andhra Pradesh, running for over 150 and 100 days respectively. Moonnam Mura was remade in Telugu as Magadu (1990), starring Rajasekhar.

Plot 

A group of high-ranking political officials are on a trip when their bus is hijacked by a group of terrorists headed by Charles. They demand the release of their old colleagues languishing in prison in exchange for safe release of the politicians. DIG Menon is handling the negotiations. Soon things start getting out of control and couple of hostages are killed.

That's when Menon decides to enlist the help of Ali Imran in rescuing the hostages. Ali is an ex cop who quit the police force out of disgust due to the unfair treatment meted out to him while he was in the force. This decision is met with some opposition from the Chief of police and his son in law as their politics and attitude prompted Ali to leave the force.

Though unwilling at first but after persuaded by DIG Menon, Ali decides to go ahead with the rescue mission. After careful surveillance Ali along with a couple of his friends is able to sneak into the palace where the hostages are bundled up and manages to rescue them and finish off Charles in the end.

Cast
Mohanlal as Ali Imran
Suresh Gopi as Vaishakhan
Lalu Alex as Charles
Sukumaran as D.I.G. Menon
Revathi as Mini Johnson 
Mukesh as Vinod
Murali as Jayan
Janardhanan as I. G. Mathews
Sreenath as DySP Raju
Prathapachandran as Bharathan Menon
Vijayaraghavan as Karunan
Babu Antony as Antony
Innocent as Jacob Pothen
C. I. Paul as Home Minister Sukumaran Pillai
Babu Namboothiri as Mohan
Paravoor Bharathan as Balakrishnan
Mala Aravindan as Chandrappan, Driver
Kollam Thulasi as Home Secretary Chandrashekharan NAir
Jose as Doctor
M. S. Thripunithura as Namboothiri
T. P. Madhavan as Panicker
Ponnambalam as Peter
Mohan Raj as Goonda
V. K. Sreeraman as Simon
Priya as Ali Imran's Sister
Shyama as Bharathan Menon's Daughter 
Valsala Menon as Bharathan Menon's Wife
Lalithasree as Panicker's Wife
Suma Jayaram as Bharathan Menon's Daughter 
K. Madhu as Ship Roomboy (Cameo Appearance)
Mafia Sasi as Sasi (Goonda)

Reception
Moonnam Mura was one of the highest-grossing Malayalam films of the year. The film had a large pre-release hype, that resulted in a large crowd on the opening day. On the release day at Jose theatre, Thrissur, 15 people were injured and one died due to mass rush for the film.

Remakes

References

External links
 

1988 films
1980s Malayalam-language films
Indian action thriller films
Films about terrorism in India
Fictional portrayals of the Kerala Police
Malayalam films remade in other languages
Films directed by K. Madhu
Films scored by Shyam (composer)